The 2019 Butler Bulldogs football team represented Butler University in the 2019 NCAA Division I FCS football season. They were led by 14th-year head coach Jeff Voris and played their home games at the Bud and Jackie Sellick Bowl. They are members of the Pioneer Football League.

Previous season

The Bulldogs finished the 2018 season 4–7, 2–6 in PFL play to finish in a three-way tie for seventh place.

Preseason

Preseason coaches' poll
The Pioneer League released their preseason coaches' poll on July 30, 2019. The Bulldogs were picked to finish in seventh place.

Preseason All-PFL teams
The Bulldogs had five different players selected to the preseason all–PFL teams.

Offense

First team

Pace Temple – WR

Second team

Tommy Kennedy – OL

Defense

Second team

Mason Brunner – LB

Luke Sennett – DB

Special teams

Second team

Drew Bevelhimer – K

Mason Brunner – LS

Schedule

Game summaries

vs. North Dakota State

Indiana Wesleyan

Taylor

at Princeton

at Stetson

Drake

at Morehead State

Jacksonville

at Marist

Davidson

Valparaiso

at Dayton

References

Butler
Butler Bulldogs football seasons
Butler Bulldogs football